The Coudersport Historic District is a historic district in Coudersport, the county seat of Potter County, Pennsylvania in the United States. The district encompasses 73 contributing buildings. Coudersport is in a narrow valley on the Allegheny River and was a boom town when the lumber industry cut the white pine and hemlock forests in the county. Much of the borough's Victorian era architecture stems from this time, and when the lumber was exhausted by the early 20th century, the borough declined in population and economically, preserving many of the historic structures.  The district is centered on the Courthouse Square and notable buildings include the Park United Methodist Church (1893), Presbyterian Church (1902), Episcopal Church (1883), Old Hickory Tavern, and Coudersport Consistory complex.

The Coudersport Historic District was added to the National Register of Historic Places on May 9, 1985. The Potter County Courthouse added  to the National Register of Historic Places on February 24, 1975, is within the district.

References

External links

 Coudersport Consistory website
 Presbyterian Church, Coudersport, Potter County, PA: 1 photo at Historic American Buildings Survey
 Ives House, Third & East Streets, Coudersport, Potter County, PA: 4 photos, 14 measured drawings, and 6 data pages, at Historic American Buildings Survey
 Lillibridge House, Coudersport, Potter County, PA: 3 photos at Historic American Buildings Survey
 Coudersport Jail, Coudersport, Potter County, PA: 1 photo at Historic American Buildings Survey

Historic districts on the National Register of Historic Places in Pennsylvania
Buildings and structures in Potter County, Pennsylvania
Queen Anne architecture in Pennsylvania
National Register of Historic Places in Potter County, Pennsylvania